Tibor Nádas (15 March 1925 – 3 October 1968) was a Hungarian rower. He competed at the 1948 Summer Olympics and the 1952 Summer Olympics.

References

1925 births
1968 deaths
Hungarian male rowers
Olympic rowers of Hungary
Rowers at the 1948 Summer Olympics
Rowers at the 1952 Summer Olympics
Rowers from Budapest